"What Kind of Fool (Do You Think I Am)" is a 1964 single written by Ray Whitley and recorded by the Tams.

Background
This track was one of the many hit records recorded at Rick Hall's FAME Studios in Muscle Shoals, Alabama. Musicians on this track included Norbert Putnam on bass, Jerry Carrigan on drums, David Briggs on piano, Terry Thompson and Earl "Peanut" Montgomery on guitar, and Jill Shires on flute.

Chart performance
The single was the group's most successful release on both the United States R&B and pop charts.  "What Kind of Fool (Do You Think I Am)" went to number one on the Cash Box R&B chart and peaked at number nine on the Billboard Hot 100.

Cover versions
The song was covered by Bill Deal and the Rhondels in 1969, and peaked at number 23 on the Billboard Hot 100.
Del Shannon covered this song on his posthumously-released album Rock On!.

References

1964 singles
1969 singles
American rhythm and blues songs
1964 songs
Songs written by Ray Whitley (songwriter)